Takaaki Hattori (October 1, 1912 – March 24, 1993) was the 9th Chief Justice of Japan (1979–1982). He was a graduate of the University of Tokyo. He was a recipient of the Order of the Rising Sun.

References

Bibliography
山本祐司『最高裁物語（上）』（日本評論社、1994年）（講談社+α文庫、1997年）
山本祐司『最高裁物語（下）』（日本評論社、1994年）（講談社+α文庫、1997年）

1912 births
1993 deaths
Chief justices of Japan
Grand Cordons of the Order of the Rising Sun
University of Tokyo alumni
People from Aichi Prefecture